Snooker world rankings 2010/2011: The professional world rankings for all the professional snooker players who qualified for the 2010/2011 season are listed below. The rankings worked as a two-year rolling list. The points for each tournament two years ago were removed, when the corresponding tournament during the current season has finished. The following table contains the rankings, which were used to determine the seedings for certain tournaments.

Notes

 John Higgins was suspended from all tournaments until 2 November 2010.
 Rankings used from the end of the 2009/2010 season was used for the seeding of the Shanghai Masters and World Open.
 Revision 1 was used for the seeding of the UK Championship, the Masters and the Snooker Shoot-Out.
 Revision 2 was used for the seeding of the German Masters and the Welsh Open.
 Revision 3 was used for the seeding of the China Open and the World Championship.

References

2010
Rankings 2011
Rankings 2010